The Delta may refer to:
 The Niger Delta, an oil-rich region of Nigeria
 The Arkansas Delta, one of the six natural regions of the state of Arkansas
 The Mississippi Delta, the distinctive northwest section of the U.S. state of Mississippi that lies between the Mississippi and Yazoo rivers
 The Nile Delta, where the Nile empties into the Mediterranean Sea
 The Sacramento River Delta
 The Delta (film), 1996

See also
Delta (disambiguation)
River delta